Sidney Douglas Farrar (August 10, 1859 – May 7, 1935) was an American professional baseball infielder. He played in Major League Baseball (MLB) from 1883 through 1890 for the Philadelphia Quakers and Philadelphia Athletics. He was the father of opera singer Geraldine Farrar.

References

External links

1859 births
1935 deaths
Major League Baseball infielders
Baseball players from Maine
People from Paris, Maine
Philadelphia Quakers players
Philadelphia Athletics (PL) players
19th-century baseball players
New Haven Nutmegs players
Providence Grays (minor league) players
Burials at Kensico Cemetery